The Iron Stone is an album released in 2006 by Robin Williamson. It is the third in a trio of Robin Williamson albums on ECM Records. "The Yellow Snake" and "The Iron Stone" are originally from the album Wee Tam and the Big Huge by The Incredible String Band, and "Verses At Ellesmere" and "Political lies" are from Ten of Songs.

Track listing 
"The Climber" (Maneri, Möller, Phillips, Williamson)
"Sir Patrick Spens" (Traditional)
"Wyatt's Song of Reproach" (Williamson, Wyatt)
"There Is a Music" (Maneri, Phillips, Williamson)
"Even Such Is Time" (Morison, Raleigh)
"The Iron Stone" (Williamson)
"The Badger" (Clare, Maneri, Möller, Phillips, Williamson)
"Political Lies" (Williamson)
"The Yellow Snake" (Williamson)
"Loftus Jones" (Maneri, Turlough O'Carolan, Phillips, Williamson)
"Bacchus" (Emerson, Maneri, Möller, Phillips, Williamson)
"The Praises of the Mountain Hare" (Maneri, Möller, Phillips, Williamson)
"To God in God's Absence" (Williamson)
"Verses at Ellesmere" (Williamson)
"Henceforth" (Maneri, Phillips, Williamson)

Personnel 
Robin Williamson – Vocals, Celtic Harp, Chinese Flute, Mohan Veena
Barre Phillips – Double Bass
Ale Möller – Flute, Trumpet, Accordion, Shawm, Mandola, Jaw Harp
Mat Maneri – Fiddle, Viola

2006 albums
Robin Williamson albums
ECM Records albums